Rinold George "Ryne" Duren (February 22, 1929 – January 6, 2011) was an American relief pitcher in Major League Baseball.

He was known for the combination of his blazing fastball and his very poor vision. With his thick eyeglasses, few batters dared to dig in against Duren. Casey Stengel said, "I would not admire hitting against Ryne Duren, because if he ever hit you in the head you might be in the past tense."

Career
Duren was originally signed by the St. Louis Browns as a free agent before the  season. His only game with the franchise, his major league game debut, came on September 25, by which time the Browns had become the Baltimore Orioles. On September 21, he was traded to the Kansas City Athletics with Jim Pisoni in exchange for Al Pilarcik and Art Ceccarelli.

The Athletics and New York Yankees were frequent trading partners in that era, and on June 15, Duren, Pisoni, and Harry Simpson were sent to the Yankees for Billy Martin, Ralph Terry, Woodie Held, and Bob Martyn. Duren kept his A's uniform number of 26 with the Yankees. He has been retroactively credited with saving 20 games in 1958, the high mark in the American League that year. In 1959, his win–loss record was much poorer, but his earned run average of 1.88 was the best of his career.

Duren was a showman. In those days the Yankee bullpen was a part of the short-porch right field and only a low chain link fence served as the boundary. When called upon by Casey Stengel to relieve, he wouldn't use the gate, but preferred to hop the fence with one hand and begin a slow walk to the mound with his blue Yankee warm-up jacket covering his pitching arm; he followed this routine even on the hottest days. When he finally took the ball and began his warmups, the first pitch was sometimes a hard fastball 20 feet over the catcher's head. The succeeding warmup pitches would be thrown lower and lower (but not slower) until Duren would finally "find" the plate. He was so wild that he allegedly hit a player in the on-deck circle.

Duren stayed with the Yankees until May 8, when he was traded to the Los Angeles Angels; Duren, Johnny James, and Lee Thomas went to the Angels in exchange for Tex Clevenger and Bob Cerv. Shortly after being traded to the Angels, he struck out seven successive Red Sox batters, then an American League record. He was sold to the Philadelphia Phillies before the  season.  Early in the  season, he was shipped to the Cincinnati Reds. Released by Cincinnati in April , he was signed by the Phillies; after being released two months later, he joined the Washington Senators, but was released again on August 24 to bring a close to his 10-year Major League career.

Personal
In , Duren was presented with the Yankee Family Award for his conquering alcoholism, and for service as an alcohol abuse educator. In 2003, Duren and author Tom Sabellico wrote the book, I Can See Clearly Now. Duren talks from the heart about life, baseball and alcohol. The foreword was written by Jim "Mudcat" Grant.

Duren's nephew is singer Blackie Lawless of the heavy metal band W.A.S.P.

Baseball Hall of Famer Ryne Sandberg was named in honor of Duren.

Duren was the inspiration for the character Ricky "Wild Thing" Vaughn in the movie Major League, according to its author and director David S. Ward.

See also
 List of Major League Baseball annual saves leaders
 List of Major League Baseball single-inning strikeout leaders

References

External links

Ryne Duren at SABR (Baseball BioProject)
Ryne Duren at  Baseball Almanac
Ryne Duren at Baseball Biography

1929 births
2011 deaths
Alcohol abuse counselors
American disabled sportspeople
American expatriate baseball players in Canada
American League All-Stars
Anderson Rebels players
Baltimore Orioles players
Baseball players from Wisconsin
Cincinnati Reds players
Dayton Indians players
Denver Bears players
Kansas City Athletics players
Los Angeles Angels players
Major League Baseball pitchers
Navegantes del Magallanes players
American expatriate baseball players in Venezuela
New York Yankees players
People from Cazenovia, Wisconsin
Philadelphia Phillies players
Pine Bluff Judges players
San Antonio Missions players
Scranton Miners players
Seattle Rainiers players
Vancouver Mounties players
Washington Senators (1961–1971) players
Wausau Lumberjacks players
Writers from Wisconsin